Buffalo Bill's is a hotel and casino in Primm, Nevada, United States, at the California state line. It is one of the Primm Valley Resorts, owned and operated by Affinity Gaming. It has 1,242 guest rooms and suites. The hotel is home to the now closed Desperado roller coaster, a hypercoaster with a 225-foot drop and a top speed of 80 mph, as well as a pool in the shape of a buffalo. The hotel-casino has two hotel room towers: the Annie Oakley Tower (the A Tower) and the Buffalo Bill Tower (B Tower). It is named after Buffalo Bill.

The  casino has over 1,700 slot machines, as well as table games, and a race and sports book. Buffalo Bill's is also home of the Star of the Desert Arena, a 6,500-seat arena designed for concerts. Buffalo Bill's closed in March 2020, due to the COVID-19 pandemic in Nevada.  It reopened in December 2022, following renovations.

History
The casino opened on May 14, 1994 with 592 hotel rooms, and a new tower was added in 1995.

The ribbon cutting for the change of ownership for Primm Valley Resorts from MGM Mirage to Herbst Gaming was held at Buffalo Bill's on April 10, 2007.

Herbst undertook a marketing strategy of appealing especially to California Latinos, including the addition of Spanish-speaking dealers, charter bus trips from the Inland Empire, concerts by norteño musician Ramón Ayala, and a Mexican restaurant branded with Ayala's name.

The interiors and exteriors of the casino were used in the movie Top of the World (1997) starring Peter Weller, Dennis Hopper and Tia Carrere. Today the roller coaster is usually running only on weekends.

In March 2019 Cuca's Mexican Food, originally from Redlands, California, opened their first hotel location in Nevada within Buffalo Bill's.  This restaurant is an extension of the brand that has 6 locations in the Inland Empire of California.

Buffalo Bill's closed in March 2020, due to the COVID-19 pandemic in Nevada. It underwent renovations, which included restaurant upgrades and new slot machines, before reopening on December 23, 2022.

Tram to Primm Valley
A tram links Buffalo Bill's to nearby Primm Valley Resort. The multi-car tram was designed by Schwager-Davis to their UniTrak standard. Despite its name, the tram actually runs on two guideways. Each car accommodates 24 people; the four-car trains can seat 96 people with no standees. The system can transport 2,200 people, per hour, per direction (pphpd). An attendant supervises each tram, although the tram is controlled by a computer.

After disembarking at the Primm Valley Resort station, passengers can connect to a free single-car tram across I-15 to Whiskey Pete's, although the connection takes a walk across the entire hotel.

References

External links
 

Casinos in Primm, Nevada
Hotels in Primm, Nevada
UniTrak people movers
Affinity Gaming
Casinos completed in 1994
Hotel buildings completed in 1994
Resorts in Nevada
Casino hotels
1994 establishments in Nevada